Klaipėda Airfield  is a privately run aerodrome with a focus on sports aviation and charter services.

The field has two runways, parallel and adjacent: one with an asphalt concrete pavement measuring 500 x 21 metres, the other a grass surface measuring 590 x 42 metres.

On the North side of the field is a VOR radio navigation beacon.

See also
 List of the largest airports in the Nordic countries

References

External links

Airports in Lithuania
Buildings and structures in Klaipėda County
Organizations based in Klaipėda
Transport in Klaipėda